NADP-retinol dehydrogenase (all-trans retinal reductase, all-trans-retinol dehydrogenase, NADP(H)-dependent retinol dehydrogenase/reductase, RDH11, RDH12, RDH13, RDH14, retinol dehydrogenase 12, retinol dehydrogenase 14, retinol dehydrogenase (NADP+), RalR1, PSDR1) is an enzyme with systematic name retinol:NADP+ oxidoreductase. This enzyme catalyses the following chemical reaction

 retinol + NADP+  retinal + NADPH + H+

This enzyme has greater catalytic efficiency in the reductive direction.

References

External links 
 

EC 1.1.1